The Ministry of Public Works (MPW), is the regional executive department of the Bangsamoro Autonomous Region in Muslim Mindanao (BARMM) responsible for affairs relating to the construction and maintenance of government infrastructure in the region.

History
When the ARMM was succeeded by the Bangsamoro Autonomous Region in Muslim Mindanao (BARMM) in 2019, the regional departments of the former Autonomous Region in Muslim Mindanao were reconfigured into ministries of Bangsamoro. The Ministry of Public Works succeeded from the ARMM regional office of the Department of Public Works and Highways.

Bangsamoro Interim Chief Minister Murad Ebrahim appointed himself as Minister of Public Works. Murad took over the DPWH–ARMM, which was reorganized into the Ministry of Public Works on February 26, 2019 in an official turnover ceremony. On November 11, 2019 as part of a cabinet reshuffle, Ebrahim transferred Finance Eduard Guerra to the MPW and named him as Public Works Minister.

Role
The Ministry of Public Works is responsible for affairs relating to public works particularly the construction maintenance of infrastructure related to roads, ports, flood control and shore protection, and water resource development system in Bangsamoro. It also issues safety regulation covering both public and private structures in the region.

Organization
The ministry's operation is aided by eight District Engineering Offices, four each in the Basulta and Mainland areas, and four Area Equipment Services.

District Engineering Offices

Basulta
Basilan District Engineering Office
Sulu 1st District Engineering Office
Sulu 2nd District Engineering Office
Tawi-Tawi District Engineering Office

Mainland
Maguindanao 1st District Engineering Office
Maguindanao 2nd District Engineering Office
Lanao del Sur 1st District Engineering Office
Lanao del Sur 2nd District Engineering Office

Area Equipment Services
Sulu Area Equipment Services
Tawi-Tawi Area Equipment Services
Maguindanao Area Equipment Services
Lanao Area Equipment Services

Ministers

References

Public Works
Bangsamoro
Public works ministries